During the Empire of Japan and up to 1945, Japan was dependent on imported foods and raw materials for industry. At the time, Japan had one of the largest merchant fleets in the world with a total of approximately 6 million tonnes of displacement before December 1941. Despite heavy naval losses during the Pacific War, Japan was still left with 4,700,000 tonnes.

Trade

Despite popular perception, during the 1930s Japan was exporting low-cost items successfully. However, between the years of 1929 and 1938 foreign commerce dropped from 3.7% to 3.5%. Japan ran a trade deficit, selling a total of US$12.85 and buying US$15.25 per capita.  This was in part brought on by the purchase of wartime materials.

Japan's primary trading partners in order were:

United States
Manchukuo
Wang Jingwei Government
Mengjiang
Occupied Chinese territories
India
United Kingdom
Dutch Indies

Japan exported 32% of its total output to the United States, and purchased 21% of its foreign trade.

Japan's imports were as follows:
32% - cotton
9% - wool
9% - iron
6% - petroleum
4% - machinery
3% - soybeans
2% - wheat

Japan's exports were as follows:
19% - wool articles
15% - raw silk
15% - rayon
3% - machinery

Japan's primary exports were raw silk, controlling 80% of the world's production, and tea, controlling 10%.

Japan's total foreign trade was equivalent to Belgium, a country with less than 10% of Japan's population.

In 1897, the local monetary unit, the yen, was valued on the gold standard at a base level of 24.5 British Pence, which permits the use in the figures of the pound sterling or gold-backed US dollars.

(1 Yen = 24.5 British Penny or 10.8 Yen = 1 British Guinea = 1.05 Pounds Sterling)

During the worldwide depression (1931 to 1934), Japanese exterior commerce grew. The expansion of this trade was in part due to European difficulties in supplying their colonies, allowing Japan to expand into new markets. Before the war, crude silk represented one-third of exports and 10% of processed silk. Other products for export were rayon, cotton, processed silk and others. In 1937 exports were crude silk, cotton fabrics, and rayon. Japan was importing raw cotton, wool, and oil imported products.

Other exterior commerce statistics

Japan was the first Asiatic independent state to export manufactured objects (e.g., silks, fabrics) and the first to import machinery and raw materials.

The metal-based manufacturing industry was not very active in 1918 exports, but porcelain, paper and matches were sold, and sugar and tea were exported from Formosa.

In imports raw materials represented around 60%, as raw cotton, unfinished metals and machinery, and foodstuffs at 14%.

For more numbers, see the following statistics from 1890 to 1927:

In 1925, external trade was equivalent of 404 French francs per inhabitant (the nominal monetary value of the Yen at the time was 12.72 Frs., with exchange variations between 13.60 in 1918 to 10.46 during 1925.) In 1926, the general value of exports was 2,045 million Yen, the imports 2,377 million
Yen. During 1927, numbers were slightly down at 1,992 million of Yen in sellings and 2,179 in buyings.

Other Japanese statistics (1900 to 1925) in thousands of Yen (one Yen equalled 5 Spanish pesetas in 1925)

The total of these exports in the same years:

1900: 600
1905: 500
1910: 700
1915: 2,000
1920: 2,200
1925: 2,400

Chosen's exports

More than 90% of Chosen's exterior commerce was with Japan and Manchukuo. In 1939, Chosen was importing $300,000,000 worth of goods and exporting $250,000,000 worth of goods, a deficit which continued for years.

The principal articles for export were:
Rice
Silk
Soybeans
Wolfram (Tungsten)
Graphite
Gold
Chemical products

The principal imports were:
Petroleum
Metallic products
Machinery and Trucks
Sugar
Rye
Maize

More than 16,000,000 tonnes of merchant vessels entered the province in 1936 via Fusan, the fourth largest port in the Japanese Empire.

Japanese industry and commerce became focused on export and foreign sales, and the local markets unsatisfied because of low demand.

Formosa's exports: (1929 to 1933)

Rice: 20%
Sugar: 55%
Tropical fruits: 5%
Camphor (processed or raw state): 2%
Oolong and other types of tea: 2%
Minerals (processed or raw state): 5%

Other foreign investments

Japanese companies had invested 18,560,000 Yen in the Dutch East Indies (Sumatra and Borneo) and some 51,195,000 Yen in rubber plantations in the British Straits Settlements (British Malaya) (260 km2 in major production from 1927).

Japanese capital investment in China to 1927 was 1900 million Yen. Apart from Manchuria, the Japanese interests were concentrated in the Yangtze Basin areas (Shanghai, Hankow-Wuhan, Kiangsi). Japanese banking interests financed 50% of the Chinese cotton industry sector.

Naval construction

In 1893 naval construction was in the range 177,000 to 1,528,000 tons. In 1913 this increased to 3,565,000 tons. In 1924 there were 237 new vessels of 500 tons and another 11 of 10,000 tonnes, continuing the growth to 4,140,000 tonnes in 1928. The Imperial Japanese Navy was the third largest in the world behind the British and American navies, and dominated the West Pacific area before the war. The first modern shipyard was founded in 1891. From this time naval construction rapidly advanced. Japanese vessels of more 100 tonnes represented a registered tonnage total of 5,007,000 tonnes of which 1,198,000 corresponded to the naval construction period of 1936 to 1938. Old vessels were decommissioned or disarmed, while the regular fleet was efficient and modern.

In peacetime Japan constructed a lower annual figure of 500,000 tonnes of shipping. Japan still rivalled Norway for third place in the world merchant fleet. Its vessels were of lower quality. Almost 1,000,000 tonnes were of the modern type, but the larger part of the current fleet was antiquated, with only half-a-dozen vessels of tonnage over 10,000 tonnes.

See also
Imperial Japanese Army Railways and Shipping Section
Ministry of the Navy of Japan
Merchant-shipping codes: JN-39 (Maru code)/JN-40/JN-152/JN-167

References 

Empire of Japan
Economic history of World War II
Economic history of Japan
Jap